This is a list of Spanish television related events from 2010.

Events
 30 March: Digital television transition is completed in Spain.
 31 March: Spanish Parliament passes Law 7/2010, concerning Audiovisual Media Services .
 11 July: Broadcasting of the 2010 FIFA World Cup Final by Telecinco, Canal + becomes the most watched TV broadcasting in 30 the last 30 years, with  13.933.000 viewers (82,9% share),  and 16.815.000 viewers (91% of share) in the Extra time.
 23 August: TV Channel Nitro starts broadcasting.
 1 September: Children’s TV Channel Boing starts broadcasting.
 Telecinco starts broadcasting in high-definition.
 28 September: Antena 3 starts broadcasting in high-definition.
 1 November: Two new TV Channels laSexta2 y la Sexta 3 are launched.
 29 November – TV Channel Trece starts broadcasting.
 28 December: CNN+ closes after 11 years.

Debuts

Television shows

Ending this year

Changes of network affiliation

Deaths
 25 February - Rafael de Penagos, 86, voice actor.
 15 March - Blanca Sendino, 83, actress.
 11 April - Juan Manuel Gozalo, 65 periodista deportivo.
 14 April - Vicente Haro, 79, actor.
 30 April - Jordi Estadella, 61, host and voice actor.
 12 May - Antonio Ozores, 81, actor.
 20 June - Covadonga Cadenas, 64, actress.
 26 July - Antonio Gamero, 76, actor.
 24 August - Eugenia Roca, 82, actress.
 7 September - Joaquín Soler Serrano, 91, journalist.
 19 September - José Antonio Labordeta, 75, singer and host.
 12 October - Manuel Alexandre, 92, actor.
 13 October - Alberto Oliveras, 80, host.
 26 October - Llàtzer Escarceller, 96, actor.
 25 December - Asunción Villamil, 83, actress.
 27 December - Luis Mariñas, 63, journalist.

See also
 2010 in Spain
 List of Spanish films of 2010

References